Sphaerophysa dianchiensis is a critically endangered species of stone loach endemic to the Dian Lake in China, but it has not been confirmed in decades and is likely extinct.

References

Nemacheilidae
Fish described in 1988
Taxonomy articles created by Polbot